I Married a Princess is a 2005 reality show on the Lifetime TV network  that starred Catherine Oxenberg and her husband Casper Van Dien.  The show's slogan is "under the tiara and behind the shades - a real life look at a fairy-tale family." The show's core conceit is technically false: although Oxenberg is descended from Serbian royalty and she is technically in the line of succession to several extant titles, she holds no royal or noble rank herself and is not considered a princess by any government.

Personalities
 Catherine Oxenberg - Not your average spoiled princess. She is a very generous person who organizes charities.
 Casper Van Dien - American actor. Macho man who will do anything for his wife and kids.
 India Riven Oxenberg - Thirteen-year-old aspiring actress, Catherine's daughter from a previous relationship.
 Cappy Van Dien - Ten-year-old animal loving boy, Casper's son from his first marriage.
 Gracie Van Dien - Nine-year-old sweet and loving. The more caring one of the group, and Casper's daughter from his first marriage.
 Maya Van Dien - Three-year-old with spunk, favorite word is no.  Trademark is messy hair. Sometimes very grumpy. Daughter of Catherine and Casper.
 Celeste Alma Van Dien - One-year-old who is the baby of the family. Daughter of Catherine and Casper.
 Nemo - The family dog who loves water.

External links

American dating and relationship reality television series
Lifetime (TV network) original programming
2000s American reality television series
2005 American television series debuts
2005 American television series endings